The 1995–96 Drake Bulldogs men's basketball team represented Drake University during the 1995–96 NCAA Division I men's basketball season. The Bulldogs, led by 6th-year head coach Rudy Washington, played their home games at the Knapp Center in Des Moines, Iowa, as members of the Missouri Valley Conference (MVC).

The Bulldogs were well-positioned in the conference standings at the halfway point of the MVC schedule, but hit a wall down the stretch in losing nine of their final 11 games. Drake finished the season with a record of 12–15 (8–10 MVC). Despite slight improvement in record during his tenure, Coach Washington never achieved a season above .500 and resigned as head coach on March 1, 1996. He would be succeeded by Kurt Kanaskie.

Roster

Schedule and results

|-
!colspan=9 style=| Non-conference regular season

|-
!colspan=9 style=| MVC regular season

|-
!colspan=12 style=| MVC Tournament

Source

References

Drake Bulldogs men's basketball seasons
Drake
Drake
Drake